Elijah Allan-Blitz (born February 18, 1987), is an American actor, musician, and Emmy award winning film director. He is known for his direction of the Emmy-nominated virtual reality experience "Take Every Wave: Laird in VR", which won a Lumiere Award.

Background
Allan-Blitz was born in Santa Barbara, California. As a musician, his single "Hey Yo" was nominated in the Grand Jury Award for Best Music Video (Best Visual) category at the International Festival of Cinema Awards.

He has worked on The Shield, independent films and short films and the Peter Bogdanovich feature film, She's Funny That Way.

Allan-Blitz, is one of the first virtual reality directors for Time magazine, and an Emmy nominee and Lumiere Award winner. His virtual reality experience about the Holocaust was published as a companion piece for the Ken Burns documentary, Defying the Nazis: The Sharps' War.

He has also directed virtual reality experiences for PBS, Van Jones, Aloe Blacc, HBO, Laird Hamilton and a VR psychedelic trip for Michael Pollan's book How To Change Your Mind.

Personal life
Allan-Blitz started dating actress Brie Larson in 2019.

Filmography
 The Shield (Jeffrey), 2003
 In This Life (Maxwell/Lance/Seth), 2013
 She's Funny That Way (Cloisters Security Guard), 2014
 Envoy (Sniper), 2014
 Breakup Moving Service (Boyfriend #2), 2014
 Full Ride (Luke), 2014
 Miami Dead County (Jake), 2016
 In This Life (Maxwell), 2018

Discography
 "The Way the World Ends" (feat. Bishop Lamont), single, 2010
 "Come With Me Child" (feat. Aja & Elena), single, 2010
 "Dmt", single, 2011
 The Photon Belt, album, 2012

References

External links
 

1987 births
Living people
21st-century American male actors
American hip hop singers
Male actors from Santa Barbara, California